Innokentyevka is a rural locality (a selo) in Kizhinginsky District, Republic of Buryatia, Russia. The population was 144 as of 2010. There are 3 streets.

Geography 
Innokentyevka is located 17 km northeast of Kizhinga (the district's administrative centre) by road. Ulzyte is the nearest rural locality.

References 

Rural localities in Kizhinginsky District